The Bishop of Grafton is the diocesan bishop of the Anglican Diocese of Grafton, Australia.

List of Bishops of Grafton

References

External links

 – official site

 
Lists of Anglican bishops and archbishops
Anglican bishops of Grafton